Charles Jewtraw (May 5, 1900 – January 26, 1996) was an American speed skater, who won the first gold medal (in the 500 m) at the first Winter Olympics in 1924; he finished eighth in the 1500 m and 13th in the 5000 m events. Jewtraw won national titles in 1921 and 1923 and held the national record in 100 yards at 9.4 seconds. After the 1924 Games he retired from competitions and moved to New York, where he became a representative for the Spalding Sporting Goods Company.

Jewtraw moved to Palm Beach, Florida, where he died in January 1996 at 95 years of age. He was married to Natalie, who died in November 1994.

Jewtraw's gold medal is now located in the Museum of American History at the Smithsonian Institution in Washington.

References

External links
Charles Jewtraw at SkateResults.com
1924 Winter Olympics

1900 births
1996 deaths
American male speed skaters
Speed skaters at the 1924 Winter Olympics
Medalists at the 1924 Winter Olympics
Olympic gold medalists for the United States in speed skating
People from Clinton County, New York
People from Lake Placid, New York